Gianfranco Renato Espejo Reyes (4 March 1988 – 4 June 2011) was a Peruvian footballer who played as a midfielder for Sporting Cristal and Juan Aurich.

Club career
He rejoined Cristal from Juan Aurich in January 2011.

Personal life

Death
Espejo died in a traffic accident on 4 June 2011.

References

External links

1988 births
2011 deaths
Footballers from Lima
Peruvian footballers
Association football midfielders
Sporting Cristal footballers
Juan Aurich footballers
Road incident deaths in Peru
Peru international footballers